Suzhou Center Mall is a large shopping mall located in Suzhou, China. The mall opened in November 2017 and was developed by the Singaporean Management company CapitaLand. The mall spans over 300,000 square meters and houses over 600 different branded stores.

The Suzhou Center mall is currently the largest mall in Suzhou. It is 7 stories tall and features attractions such as an area for horse riding lessons, an Olympic sized ice rink, and a gourmet grocery store. 

In 2018 the mall won the MAPIC Award for "Best New Shopping Center" which recognizes innovation and quality in the global retail real estate industry.

References 

Shopping malls in Suzhou